Raymond Robertson may refer to:

 Raymond Robertson (politician), Scottish Conservative Party politician, former MP
Ray Robertson, Canadian writer

See also
 Raymond Robertson-Glasgow (1901–1965), British cricketer and cricket writer